Cassette Kids are a Sydney-based band formed in 2007. They won the Unearthed Sydney 2008 Big Day Out competition and were nominated for a 2008 Unearthed J Award. Their song "You Take It" was a Triple J's Ausmusic Month featured track and had a video made for it which has appeared on Channel V, MTV and rage. Another song, "Acrobat", was on high rotation on Triple J. In October 2008 they released their debut mini album We Are. The band have toured nationally with The Presets, as well as British pop singer Lily Allen, The Fratellis, Ben Lee, Bluejuice, The Music and New Young Pony Club. In October 2009, Cassette Kids released the single Lying Around which appears on their debut album "Nothing on TV", released on 16 April 2010.

Background
Previously named Casa Del Disco, the band changed their name to Cassette Kids because every member of the band was born in the 80's and could all remember the first cassette they ever got, but couldn't remember their first CD.

Members
 Daniel Schober : Guitar
 Jacob Read-Harber : Drums
 Daniel Deitz : Bass
 Katrina Noorbergen : Vocals

Discography

Albums

EPs

Awards and nominations

J Award
The J Awards are an annual series of Australian music awards that were established by the Australian Broadcasting Corporation's youth-focused radio station Triple J. They commenced in 2005.

|-
| J Awards of 2008
|themselves
| Unearthed Artist of the Year
|

References

External links

three d world Cassette Kids – Tape It to the Limit
Scene Magazine The kids are huge
Time Off Play and record

Musical groups established in 2007
Musical groups from Sydney